James Jackson Darling (born December 29, 1974 in Denver, Colorado), is a former American football linebacker. He was originally drafted by the Philadelphia Eagles in the second round of the 1997 NFL Draft.  He played college football at Washington State.

College career
Darling played high school football at Kettle Falls High School in Kettle Falls, WA. He then played college football at Washington State University, where he was a two-time All-Pacific-10 Conference selection, and as a senior, he was also a second-team All-America selection by the Sporting News. He finished his career with 2.5 sacks, 258 tackles, four forced fumbles, and an interception.

Professional career
Darling played for ten seasons in the National Football League, he was drafted by the Philadelphia Eagles and played there for four years. He then was traded to the New York Jets, where he played for two years and finally finished his career with the Arizona Cardinals, where he played for four more years.

Career Stats

References

1974 births
Living people
Players of American football from Denver
American football linebackers
Washington State Cougars football players
Philadelphia Eagles players
New York Jets players
Arizona Cardinals players